The name Ising has been used for ten tropical cyclones in the Philippines by the PAGASA in the West Pacific Ocean.

 Typhoon Agnes (1963) (T6308, 18W, Ising), struck northern Luzon in the Philippines as a Category 2 typhoon before entering the South China Sea where it made a second landfall in China
 Typhoon Clara (1967) (T6708, 08W, Ising)
 Tropical Storm Emma (1971) (T7109, 09W, Ising)
 Typhoon Betty (1975) (T7512, 14W, Ising), struck Taiwan and China.
 Typhoon Hope (1979) (09W, Ising, 3B) – Category 4 super typhoon, brushed Taiwan then struck southern China; subsequently restrengthened to a severe tropical storm in the Bay of Bengal.
 Typhoon Forrest (1983) (T8310, 11W, Ising), a deadly and destructive Category 5 super typhoon that hit Japan.
Typhoon Cary (1987) (T8711, 10W, Ising) – made landfall on Luzon, Philippines, and later in northern Vietnam.
Typhoon Caitlin (1991) (Ising) – affected Japan and South Korea.
 Typhoon Polly (1995) (18W, Ising) – approached Luzon before curving out to sea
 Typhoon Olga (1999) (T9907, 11W, Ising) – killed 106 people in North and South Korea and caused US$657 million in damages

Pacific typhoon set index articles